Tabanus darimonti is a Mediterranean species of biting horse-fly. Only female specimens are known.

Distribution
This species is known only from Portugal, Spain, Morocco, Croatia, Herzegovina and Turkey.

References

Tabanidae
Diptera of Europe
Insects described in 1964